The Ersari carpet is a type of carpet handmade by the Ersari Turkmen of Turkmenistan and Uzbekistan.

References

Rugs and carpets